Larry Wilde (born Herman Wildman 6 February 1928) is an American actor, comedian, motivational speaker, university instructor and publisher. He is best known as the author of 53 published books of humor.

Biography
Larry Wilde, born Herman Wildman, in Jersey City, New Jersey, was the fourth child of Jewish parents Gertrude and Selig Wildman. His siblings were Milton, Benjamin and Miriam. He chose Larry Wilde as a professional name when he began a career in show business.

Wilde attended Lincoln High School where he was active in numerous extracurricular activities, including sports editor of the school paper, the Drama Club, president of the Student Body and the swimming team where he became the Jersey City 100-yard Breaststroke Champion.

He was in the Second Marine Division from 1946 to 1948. While stationed at Camp Lejeune, North Carolina, he wrote, produced, directed and performed in camp stage shows doing comedy routines. Promoted to corporal, he became the first official Marine Corps "non-commissioned comedian".

Wilde graduated from the University of Miami in Florida where he worked his way through school performing at Miami Beach nightclubs and hotels.

Works
He was the president of Poets, Essayists and Novelists (PEN) Los Angeles 1981–1983.

In 1976, he founded National Humor Month, celebrated annually in April. It is designed to heighten public awareness on how the joy and therapeutic value of laughter can improve health, boost morale, increase communication skills and enrich the quality of one's life. National Humor Month has been recognized by comedians and institutions across the US including The Huffington Post, Fox News (when the comedian Crystal Powell hosted citywide events in Houston), The Farmer's Almanac and USA Today.
With book sales over 12 million copies, The New York Times has called him "America’s Best Selling Humorist".

Wilde's book Great Comedians Talk About Comedy contains inspirational interviews with seventeen great comedians of the 20th century, revealing their secrets on extracting laughter from audiences. The comedians interviewed are Woody Allen, Jack Benny, Milton Berle, Shelley Berman, Joey Bishop, George Burns, Johnny Carson, Maurice Chevalier, Phyllis Diller, Jimmy Durante, Dick Gregory, Bob Hope, George Jessel, Jerry Lewis, Jerry Seinfeld, Danny Thomas and Ed Wynn. The original tapes of these historical interviews are now part of The Larry Wilde Collection housed in the Library of Congress.

Wilde's book How The Great Comedy Writers Create Laughter is a collection of dialogues with the writers who originate comedy for the stage, television, motion pictures and print publications. They include Goodman Ace, Art Buchwald, Abe Burrows, Mel Brooks, Bill Dana, Selma Diamond, Jack Douglas, Norman Lear, Hal Kanter, Carl Reiner and Neil Simon.

Discography
 The Joker is Wilde Dot Records
 The Official Polish/Italian Comedy Album

Filmography

Books
 The Official Polish/Italian Joke Book, Pinnacle, 1973
 The Official Jewish/Irish Joke Book, Pinnacle, 1974
 More The Official Polish/Italian Joke Book, Pinnacle, 1975
 The Official Black Folks/White Folks Joke Book, Pinnacle, 1975
 The Official Virgins/Sex Maniacs Joke Book, Pinnacle, 1975
 The Official Democrat/Republican Joke Book, Pinnacle, 1976
 The Official Religious/Not So Religious Joke Book, Pinnacle, 1976
 How the Great Comedy Writers Create Laughter, Nelson Hall, 1976
 The Official Golfers Joke Book, Pinnacle, 1977
 The Official Smart Kids/Dumb Parents Joke Book, Pinnacle, 1977
 Last Official Polish Joke Book, Pinnacle, 1977
 The Official Cat Lovers/Dog Lovers Joke Book, Pinnacle, 1978
 The Official Dirty Joke Book, Pinnacle, 1978
 The Last Official Italian Joke Book, Pinnacle, 1978
 The Complete Book of Ethnic Humor, Pinnacle, 1978
 More Official Jewish/Irish Joke Book, Pinnacle, 1979
 The Official Book of Sick Jokes, Pinnacle, 1979
 More Official Smart Kids/Dumb Parents Joke Book, Pinnacle, 1979
 Last Official Jewish Joke Book, Bantam, 1980
 More Official Democrat/Republican Joke Book, Pinnacle, 1980
 The Official Bedroom/Bathroom Joke Book, Pinnacle, 1980
 The Official Doctors Joke Book, Bantam, 1981
 More The Official Sex Maniacs Joke Book, Bantam, 1981
 The Official Lawyers Joke Book, Bantam, 1982
 Last Official Sex Maniacs Joke Book, Bantam, 1982
 Larry Wilde Book of Limericks, Bantam, 1982
 The Absolutely Last Official Polish Joke Book, Bantam, 1983
 The Last Official Smart Kids Joke Book, Bantam, 1983
 Last Official Irish Joke Book, Bantam, 1983
 The Official Politicians Joke Book, Bantam, 1984
 The Official Rednecks Joke Book, Bantam, 1984
 Absolutely Last Official Sex Maniacs Joke Book, Bantam, 1985
 The Official Book of John Jokes, Bantam, 1985
 The Official Sports Maniacs Joke Book, Bantam, 1985
 More The Official Doctors Joke Book, Bantam, 1986
 The Official Executives Joke Book, Bantam, 1986
 Ultimate Jewish Joke Book, Bantam, 1986
 The Ultimate Lawyers Joke Book, Bantam, 1987
 The Official WASP Joke Book, Bantam. 1988
 The Official All America Joke Book, Bantam, 1988
 The Larry Wilde Library of Laughter, Jester Press, 1988
 The Ultimate Sex Maniacs Joke Book, Bantam, 1989
 The Ultimate Book of Ethnic Humor, Bantam, 1989
 The Official Computer Freaks Joke Book (with Steve Wozniak), Bantam, 1989
 The Ultimate Pet Lovers Joke Book, Bantam, 1990
 The Merriest Book of Christmas Humor, Bantam, 1991
 The Official Locker Room Joke Book, Bantam, 1991
 The Official Golf Lovers Joke Book, Bantam, 1992
 The Dumb, Dumber, Dumbest Joke Book, Pinnacle, 1996
 You're Never Too Old To Laugh, Pinnacle, 1997
 When You’re Up to Your Eyeballs In Alligators, Jester Press, 2000 (revised 2006)
 Great Comedians Talk About Comedy, Citadel Press, 1968 (revised) Executive Books/Jester Press, 2000
 The Larry Wilde Treasury of Laughter, Jester Press, 2006

References

External links 
 Official Larry Wilde website
 
 Larry Wilde quotes from Famous Quotes and Authors

1928 births
Living people
American stand-up comedians
American motivational speakers
American humorists
American male television actors
Jewish American male actors
Jewish American comedians
Jewish American male comedians
21st-century American Jews